Jeff Plumb (born 6 October 1974) is an Australian table tennis player. He competed in the men's doubles event at the 2000 Summer Olympics.

References

External links
 

1974 births
Living people
Australian male table tennis players
Olympic table tennis players of Australia
Table tennis players at the 2000 Summer Olympics
Sportspeople from Canberra